Rahmi Saltuk (born in 1945 in Tunceli) is a Turkish Kurdish singer. After having made his name singing in Turkish, his 1989 album Hoy Nare was the first Kurdish album to obtain the approval of the Turkish Ministry of Culture, although the approval was reversed a few weeks later and not lifted till 1992.

Discography 
 Yenice Yolları
 Terketmedi Sevdan Beni
 Dosttan Dosta (1, 2 and 3)
 Açılın Kapılar Şaha Gidelim
 Acıyı Bal Eyledik
 Dostlara Çağrı
 Hoy Nare 1989
 Hani Kurşun Sıksan Geçmez Geceden
 Elde Hüzün Kaldı

References

1945 births
Living people
Turkish male singers
Turkish Kurdish people

Kurdish male singers